Lathrotelinae is a subfamily of the pyraloid family Crambidae described by John Frederick Gates Clarke in 1971. It currently comprises 45 species in six genera.

Description
Characteristic features of the Lathrotelinae are the undulating wing outline, the absent chaetosemata on the imaginal head, the completely reduced gnathos, and the male genitalia's aedeagus with a strongly spiculose "manica" on its posterior end. Lathrotelinae were suggested to be closely related to Acentropinae based on two synapomorphies in the second sternum of the abdomen, but a phylogenetic study of Crambidae based on genetic data found the subfamily to be the sister group of the fern-feeding Musotiminae.

Food plants
Little is known on the larval stage of Lathrotelinae. The few known larvae feed on monocotyledon plants and are occasionally found as pest species on oil palms and sugarcane.

Systematics
Until recently, Lathrotelinae have been treated within the subfamily Spilomelinae. However, recent studies concluded that Lathroteles obscura J.F.G Clarke, 1971 and several other species are misplaced in Spilomelinae and require a separate subfamily. According to the International Code of Zoological Nomenclature's Principle of Priority, the family group name Lathrotelidae J.F.G. Clarke, 1971 applies to this subfamily.

The subfamily currently includes the following genera:
Acropentias Meyrick, 1890
Diplopseustis Meyrick, 1884
Diplopseustoides Guillermet, 2013
Lathroteles J.F.G. Clarke, 1971
Orthoraphis Hampson, 1896
Sufetula Walker, 1859

References

Crambidae